The Route des Grandes Alpes is a tourist itinerary through the French Alps between Lake Geneva and the French Riviera passing over all the high passes of the Alps within France.

The road starts at Thonon-les-Bains and climbs via Les Gets and Cluses. It then heads to Saint-Gervais and Megève, over the Col des Saisies. It then passes through Beaufort, Bourg-Saint-Maurice and onto Val-d'Isère. The road then crosses the Col de l'Iseran.

The road then passes through Modane and over the Col du Galibier and then the Col du Lautaret to La Grave. The road heads to Briançon and then over the Col d'Izoard. The road then heads through Embrun and over the Col de Vars and onto Barcelonnette via Jausiers, where the choice can be made to turn south over the Col de la Bonette—with access to the highest paved through road in Europe, the Cime de la Bonette—or continue via the Col de la Cayolle.

The original end of the Route was Nice but is now Menton, reached via the cols of Saint-Martin, Turini and Castillon.

Col des Gets (1163 m)

Col de la Colombière (1613 m)

Col des Aravis (1487 m)

Col des Saisies (1650 m)

Cormet de Roselend (1967 m)

Col de l’Iseran (2764 m)

Col du Télégraphe (1566 m)

Col du Galibier (2645 m)

Col du Lautaret (2058 m)

Col d’Izoard (2360 m)

Col de Vars (2109 m)

Col de la Cayolle (2326 m)

Col de Valberg (1673 m)

Col de la Couillole (1678 m)

Col Saint-Martin (1500 m)

Col de Turini (1607 m)

Col de Castillon (706 m)

External links

Roads in France
Transport in the Alps